Naseeruddin Memorial Hall is a landmark in the city of Lakhimpur in Lakhimpur Kheri district, Uttar Pradesh, India.

History
The East India Company, originally built Willoughby Memorial Hall in 1924, was commemorated to Sir Robert William Douglas Willoughby, Deputy Commissioner of Kheri, who was killed on 26 August 1920. The colonial authorities apprehended independence activists Naseeruddin Mauzi Nagar and Rajnarayan Mishra on charges of shooting the Deputy Commissioner, and sentenced them to death by hanging. On 26 April 1936, Willoughby Memorial Library was established. The Willoughby Memorial Hall was recently renamed the Naseeruddin Memorial Hall.

References 

Monuments and memorials in Uttar Pradesh
Tourist attractions in Lakhimpur Kheri district
Lakhimpur, Uttar Pradesh